Kalle Laanet (born 25 September 1965, in Orissaare, Saare County) is Estonian politician and police officer. He is member of XIV Riigikogu. Since 2014 he belongs to Estonian Reform Party.

2002–04 he was police prefect of Tallinn.

2005–07 he was Minister of the Interior.

He has been member of XI, XII, XIII and XIV Riigikogu.

2021-22 he was the Minister of the Defence.

References

1965 births
Defence Ministers of Estonia
Estonian Reform Party politicians
Living people
Members of the Riigikogu, 2007–2011
Members of the Riigikogu, 2011–2015
Members of the Riigikogu, 2015–2019
Members of the Riigikogu, 2019–2023
Members of the Riigikogu, 2023–2027
Ministers of the Interior of Estonia
People from Orissaare